This is a list of newspapers in Maine.

 Daily newspapers This is a list of all daily newspapers in Maine. For weeklies, please see List of newspapers in Maine.
 Bangor Daily News - Bangor
 The Portland Times - Portland, Maine
 Kennebec Journal - Augusta
 Morning Sentinel - Waterville
 Portland Press Herald - Portland
 Sun Journal - Lewiston
 The Times Record - Brunswick
 The Daily Bulldog - Farmington - Online only
 Weekly newspapers 
 The Advertiser Democrat - Norway, published once a week on Thursdays
 American Journal - Westbrook
 Aroostook Republican - Caribou
 Augusta Capital Weekly - Augusta
 The Bar Harbor Times - Bar Harbor, published once a week on Thursdays
 The Bates Student - Lewiston, published once a week on Tuesdays
The Boothbay Register - Boothbay Harbor, published once a week on Thursdays
 The Bowdoin Orient - Brunswick, published once a week on Fridays
 The Bridgton News - Bridgton, published once a week on Thursdays
 The Calais Advertiser - Calais, published once a week on Thursdays
 The Camden Herald - Camden
 The Castine Patriot - Castine, published once a week on Thursdays
 The Citizen - Westbrook
 The Colby Echo - Waterville, published once a week on Tuesdays
 The Courier Gazette - Rockland
 The Current - Westbrook, published once a week on Thursdays
 The Ellsworth American - Ellsworth
 The Enterprise - Bucksport
 The Houlton Pioneer Times - Houlton, published once a week on Wednesdays
 The Island Ad-Vantages - Stonington, published once a week on Thursdays
 The Island Times - Casco Bay, published monthly
 Lakes Region Suburban Weekly - Westbrook
 The Lincoln County News - Damariscotta, published once a week on Wednesdays
 The Livermore Falls Advertiser - Livermore Falls, published once a week on Wednesdays
 Machias Valley News Observer - Machias
 Magic City Morning Star - Millinocket
 The Maine Campus - Orono, published twice a week on Mondays and Thursdays
 The Maine Edge - Bangor, published once a week on Wednesdays
 Maine Sunday Telegram - Portland
 The Maine Switch - Portland, published once a week on Thursdays
 The Mid-Coast Forecaster - published weekly alongside The Northern Forecaster, The Portland Forecaster and The Southern Forecaster
 Mount Desert Islander - Bar Harbor, published once a week on Thursdays
 The Northern Forecaster - published weekly alongside The Portland Forecaster, The Mid-Coast Forecaster and The Southern Forecaster
 The Penobscot Times - Old Town
 The Portland Forecaster  - published weekly alongside The Northern Forecaster, The Mid-Coast Forecaster and The Southern Forecaster Portland Phoenix - Portland, published once a week on Wednesdays
 The Quoddy Tides - Eastport
 The Reporter - Westbrook
 The Republican Journal - Belfast
 Six Towns Times - Freeport, published weekly on Fridays
 The St. John Valley Times - Madawaska, published once a week on Wednesdays
 The Star-Herald - Presque Isle, published once a week on Wednesdays
 The Southern Forecaster - published weekly alongside The Northern Forecaster, The Mid-Coast Forecaster and The Portland Forecaster Sun Chronicle - Westbrook)
 Twin City Times - Auburn, covering Androscoggin County and the surrounding areas; published every Thursday
 The Weekly Packet - Blue Hill, published once a week on Thursdays
 The Weekly Sentinel - Wells, published once a week on FridaysWiscasset Newspaper - Boothbay Harbor, published once a week on Thursdays
 York County Coast Star - Kennebunk, published once a week on Thursdays
 York Weekly'' - York, published once a week on Wednesdays

Further reading

See also
Nearby states
 List of newspapers in Massachusetts
 List of newspapers in New Hampshire
 List of newspapers in Vermont

References

 Maine Press Association

External links
 . (Survey of local news existence and ownership in 21st century)